St. Joseph's Institution International (often referred to as "SJI International" or "SJII") is an independent co-educational Lasallian Catholic international school at Thomson Road in Novena, Singapore. It comprises an elementary and high school. The elementary school students range in age from 4-12 while in the High School the students are aged 12–18. The high school was founded in 2006 and the elementary school opened in 2008.

The elementary school teaches the International Primary Curriculum (IPC), which is used by over 1000 schools in 65 countries around the world. Singapore maths and Chinese are also included in the curriculum as Chinese is part of the fabric of the school culture. Spanish is offered in Grades 5 and 6.

The High School caters to both local and foreign students from Grades 7 to 12. The school offers the IGCSE programme from Grades 7 to 10, and the International Baccalaureate Diploma Programme for Grades 11 and 12. The first cohort of students graduated in 2009.

History
In 2006, upon the urging of Singapore's Economic Development Board, St Joseph's Institution established an international school. SJI International High School began classes in January 2007 with 104 students. In January 2012, SJI International welcomed around 700 students from grade 7 to grade 12, a 600% increase in enrolment in five years. Numbers have continued to grow to the current (2016) High School enrolment of 1030, and 670 in the Elementary School.

SJI International High School was the third "local international" school to open in Singapore (i.e. a school which can admit both local and international students at secondary and pre-university levels) after Anglo-Chinese School (International) and Hwa Chong International School (both of which were also established by well-known local schools). It is open to both Singaporean and international students from the age of 12.  The student population is 63% Singaporean, while 31 other nationalities comprise the remaining 37%.

In adherence to government regulations, Elementary School enrolment is currently closed to Singapore citizens but open to all foreign students, provided the child holds a valid Dependent’s Pass (tied to the parent’s Employment Pass), Singapore Permanent Residency (Entry/Re -Entry Permit), or Immigration Exemption Order (for diplomats).

Association with St Joseph's Institution

SJI International School is part of a group of seven Lasallian schools in Singapore whose history dates back over 150 years. Together, the Elementary and High School form the group's first international school.  The School is a non-profit organisation and is overseen by the SJI International School Board, composed of SJI alumnae.  The School is currently supported by a Brother President and two Lasallian Brothers on the teaching staff.

Today there are 7000 La Salle Brothers and 75 000 lay Lasallian teachers working in 85 countries around the world, teaching 900 000 students in 1000 Universities, Schools and Special Education Centres. SJI International is one of these Lasallian Institutions.

Academic programme
The High School offers places to students from Grade 7 (Secondary 1) to Grade 12 (Pre-University 2), and at the end of their academic pursuit, if they have met all the requirements,  they graduate with an IB Diploma Certificate. Students in Grade 10 sit for the International General Certificate of Secondary Education (IGCSE), which is certified by the Cambridge International Examinations Board. Alternatively, they can take the Foundation IB programme (FIB) that the school offers at Grade 10.

In Grades 7 and 8, students take the foundation IGCSE course, so the aim of the curriculum in those grades is to provide a broad range of subjects necessary for the IGCSE course in Grades 9 and 10.

IGCSE
In Grades 9 and 10, under the IGCSE course, students take 9 subjects, which will be examined in November, at the end of their 2 years. Subjects include English Language, English Literature, Maths, Additional Maths, Second Languages, Physics, Chemistry, Biology, Co-ordinated Sciences, Economics, History, Geography, Music, Drama, Design and Technology and Art.

Alternatively, students in Grade 10 can take the Foundation IB curriculum. The aim of the FIB Curriculum is, in a one-year course, to prepare students for the IB Programme. Students who join SJI International either very late in Grade 9 or at the start of Grade 10 generally take the FIB course as they cannot sit the IGCSE examinations in most subjects (the IGCSE is a two-year course). Instead of sitting the externally set IGCSE examinations, all FIB students will sit internally set examinations towards the end of the academic year.

IB diploma programme
In Grades 11 and 12, students pursue the International Baccalaureate programme where they choose a subject from each of six groups, namely: 1 - First Language; 2 - Second Language; 3 - Individuals and Societies; 4 - Experimental Sciences; 5 - Mathematics; and 6 - Music, Theatre Arts, and Visual Arts. Group 6 may be replaced by another subject from Groups 3-5. This is in addition to the core section of the course, which requires students to study Theory of knowledge, write an Extended Essay, and undertake Creativity, Activity, Service. Three subjects are taken at Higher Level, which requires more focus and class time to complete than the other 3 Standard Level subjects.

Academic performance

Several of the school's students have won the International Leader of Tomorrow Scholarship for studies at the University of British Columbia. Students have also won the Jardine Foundation Scholarship (Oxford University), Freeman Asian Scholarship, ASEAN Undergraduate Scholarship, Public Service Commission Scholarship, A*Star Local Scholarship, Singapore Airlines NOL Scholarship. Other scholarships include those such as the Harvard University Faculty Scholarship, University of Queensland Centennial Scholarship and International Economics Scholarship, Trent University Global Citizenship Scholarship, University of Cincinnati Global Scholarship, Colgate University Alumni Memorial Scholarship and the University of Toronto International Scholarship.  The average IB Diploma score for the most recent (2019) cohort of 189 students was 37.7 points. The 2019 IGCSE cohort achieved 41.2% A*.

School facilities
The school has numerous facilities, including four main school blocks, 2 tennis courts, 2 basketball courts, a netball court, a large sports complex including a fitness area, and specific drama and music rooms. There are also two football fields, a swimming pool and an assembly hall. In May 2011, the school gained a new block, dubbed the La Salle Block, which is home to the Indonesian Centre (the first of its kind in Singapore), added to SJI International through the Development Fund. For its foreign students, boarding facilities are provided at external venues. In 2012 the school added the IB lounge, exclusive to Grade 11s and 12s.

In 2019, the upper football field has been upgraded to a FIFA-certified artificial turf. Additional facilities - including new classrooms, science laboratories, art rooms, a Creative Arts Centre - are also under construction and are estimated to be completed by the 3rd Quarter of 2020.

Co-curricular activities
SJI International offers a myriad of activities outside of the classroom. These activities allow students to pursue their talents and passions, while learning invaluable life skills. From the rhythm of dance and music, to the grit of soccer and rock climbing; the challenge of chess to the World Scholar’s Cup, students have a range of choice, with opportunities for competition at both intra- and inter-school levels.

In the Elementary School, a range of CCAs are offered for children from Prep 1 to Grade 6. They can choose from Sports, Visual Arts, Performing Arts, Academics, Environment, ICT and more. Catechism classes are also offered across all grades, as well as an extensive range of individual instrumental music lessons and tutoring in several languages including Spanish. In addition to the CCA programme, the PE Department runs a wide range of sporting teams while the Music Department runs several ensembles including string and choir.

In 2019, High School students were offered a choice of more than 52 sports teams (recreational and team sports) to join or represent the school with, 21 music, theatre and dance groups, and nearly 80 other clubs and activities as part of the CCA programme in Term One and Two. The vast majority of the CCAs are free for students (85%) and the small number of paid-for activities allow the students to work with professional groups in activities such as Rock-Climbing and Musical Theatre. The school's CCA programme enables students to develop an understanding of themselves and others, as well as build resilience and a desire to learn in different contexts.

The school encourages their students to select activities that will allow them to build life-long passions and interests that they may wish to pursue as part of a healthy and creative lifestyle.

Service learning
From Prep 1, students are encouraged to participate in whole school service events, which support our chosen Global Initiative Programme with our charity of choice, the Lasallian Community Education Services (LCES), in Colombo, Sri Lanka. The LCES supports the Henamulla preschool, which has 150 children and is supported by seven teachers. The Elementary School has also been collecting five and ten cent coins that will be used to support the lunches served at the Henamulla schools.

Once children reach the Upper Elementary School, they start working towards their CASS Awards. This stands for Community, Activity, Sport and Service and is used to encourage children to push themselves outside of their comfort zone and give up their time to help others both in our school community and beyond. For each badge at Bronze and Silver level, children have to carry out 3 acts of Service, such as a sponsored event or volunteer for a day. Those children who reach Gold level have to plan and carry out their own independent service project, making their own contacts with agencies and working out logistics of supplies.

In the High School, all students are involved in regular direct service activities from Grades 7 to 12. Service projects are supervised by tutors or service leaders and as students progress through High School, they are given more voice and choice in the projects they participate in but are encouraged to be actively engaged in each stage of service learning (investigation, preparation, action, reflection and demonstration) at all grade levels. Students move from working in tutor groups in partnership with Loola’s Safe Water Garden initiative in Grade 7 to organising their own service-centred trips abroad for Challenge Week, a key part of the school’s Creativity, Activity, Service (CAS) programme for Grade 11s. These student-planned, teacher-mentored projects culminate in a week of independent activity, without teacher supervision, within Southeast Asia.

In 2019, High School students participated in nearly 50 service activities, within Singapore, teaching coding to lesser advantaged children in national libraries, befriending and reading to elders in homes, and providing literacy support in a local kindergarten. Students also worked in 18 non-governmental organisations outside Singapore, spanning 6 countries.

Through such community engagement, students are exposed to a diverse range of people, cultures, environments, faiths and life experiences. This creates opportunities for personal development and enriched learning, and furthers the school's mission for students to become ‘people of integrity, people for others’.

Leadership
 Senior Council
 Junior Council
 Service Council
 Development Team
 Lasallian Council

Expeditions
Grade 7, 8, and 9 students participate in week-long expeditions overseas: to Bintan, Indonesia, Tioman and Cameron Highlands in Malaysia, and to Krabi or Chiang Mai in Thailand.  Grade 11 students plan and implement the milestone Challenge Week, when they travel to another country to serve a charity of their choice in a self-organised group.  Additional educational trips and personal development programmes – like the National Youth Achievement Award – are also supported.

Affiliated schools
 St. Joseph's Institution

References

External links 

 Official school website

Independent schools in Singapore
Catholic schools in Singapore
Secondary schools in Singapore
Novena, Singapore
Schools in Central Region, Singapore
International schools in Singapore
Cambridge schools in Singapore
International Baccalaureate schools in Singapore